Mount Baya is a dormant volcano in the municipality of Ganassi in Lanao del Sur province, Philippines. Between Lake Dapao and Mount Baya is Mount Gadungan, another inactive volcano.

The Philippine Institute of Volcanology and Seismology (PHIVOLCS) lists Mount Baya as Inactive.

See also
List of volcanoes in the Philippines
Northern Mindanao

References

External links
Mount Baya on Panoramio by Dian3406

Mountains of the Philippines
Volcanoes of Mindanao
Landforms of Lanao del Sur
Inactive volcanoes of the Philippines